The Los Angeles Clippers are a professional basketball team based in Los Angeles, California. They play in the National Basketball Association (NBA) and are a member of the NBA Western Conference's Pacific Division. The Clippers were founded in 1970 as the Buffalo Braves. They were one of three franchises that joined the NBA as an expansion team in the 1970–71 season. The Braves moved to San Diego, California after the 1977–78 season, and became known as the San Diego Clippers. For the 1984–85 NBA season, the Clippers moved north to Los Angeles and became known as the Los Angeles Clippers.

On October 14, 1970, the Braves beat the Cleveland Cavaliers 107–92 in their first game. In the 1972 NBA Draft, the Braves selected Bob McAdoo, who later won such awards as Rookie of the Year and Most Valuable Player. During McAdoo's years (1972–76) with the franchise, the Braves reached the post-season three times and had a record of nine wins and 13 losses during that time.

Overall, the Clippers have qualified for the post-season sixteen times; most recently in the 2020–21 season. They passed the first round of the playoffs seven times (1975–76, 2005–06, 2011–12, 2013–14, 2014–15, 2019–20 and 2020–21). The Clippers have never won league or Conference titles. Their 51-year drought between entering Western Conference Finals (before doing so in 2020–21) is one of the longest in league history and the 30-year drought between winning a playoffs round (before doing so in 2005–06) is the longest in league history. They also have only sixteen seasons with a winning percentage of .500 or better, and as a result, in their April 17, 2000 issue, the Sports Illustrated had three Clippers fans on the cover that stated "The worst franchise in sports history". A decade later, the additions of Blake Griffin and Chris Paul helped them win their first division title during the 2012–13 season, their 43rd year in the league, and they repeated the feat the following year. Paul and Griffin departed in 2017, and after a short transition period, the Clippers signed All-Stars Kawhi Leonard and Paul George in 2019.

Table key

Seasons

All-time records

Notes

References
General

Specific